Legacy of Blood is the fourth studio album by American hip hop group Jedi Mind Tricks. It was released on September 21, 2004 via Babygrande Records. Production was handled by member Stoupe the Enemy of Mankind, with Chuck Wilson serving as executive producer. It features guest appearances from Des Devious, GZA, Killah Priest and Sean Price.

Track listing

Notes
"Intro" samples "Make It Easy On Yourself" by The Walker Brothers and a promo from WWE wrestler Kane.
"The Darkest Throne" samples dialogue from A Bronx Tale.
"Farewell to the Flesh" samples comments from author Hunter S. Thompson and a monologue by Dolph Lundgren from the 1989 Punisher motion picture.
"The Spirit of Hate" samples dialogue from Beneath the Planet of the Apes.
"Of the Spirit and the Sun" samples an interview with Charles Manson.
"Scars of The Crucifix" contains samples from the film The Addiction.
"And So It Burns" contains samples from Giacomo Rondinella's "Keep on Lying".
"The Philosophy of Horror" contains dialogue sample from 1970 film Cromwell.

Personnel
Vincenzo "Vinnie Paz" Luvineri – rap vocals (tracks: 2, 3, 5, 6, 8-12, 14, 15, 17, 19)
Walter "Killah Priest" Reed – rap vocals (track 5)
Gary "GZA" Grice – rap vocals (tracks: 6, 15)
David "Des Devious" Edens – rap vocals (tracks: 9, 19)
Sean Price – rap vocals (track 10)
DJ Drew Dollars – scratches
Kevin "Stoupe the Enemy of Mankind" Baldwin – producer
Scott "Supe" Stallone – engineering, mixing
Chris Conway – recording (tracks: 5, 10)
J. Marty – recording (tracks: 6, 15)
Chuck Wilson – executive producer
Trevor "Karma" Gendron – design, layout
Mike McRath – photography
Chase Jones – management
Jesse Stone – management

Charts

References

External links

2004 albums
Horrorcore albums
Jedi Mind Tricks albums
Babygrande Records albums